The 1984 Calgary Stampeders finished in 5th place in the West Division with a 6–10 record and failed to make the playoffs.

Regular season

Season Standings

Season schedule

Awards and records

1984 CFL All-Stars
None

References

Calgary Stampeders seasons
1984 Canadian Football League season by team